The Conservatoria delle Coste (Coastal conservation agency) (official name: Conservatoria delle Coste della Sardegna in Italian, Conservatoria de sas Costeras de sa Sardigna in Sardinian) is a Sardinian public agency created by the Regional Law N°2 of 29 May 2007, to ensure the protection of outstanding natural areas on the Sardinian coast.

Creation

The creation of the Conservatoria delle Coste was inspired by the British National Trust, and foremost by the French Conservatoire du littoral.

The Conservatoria was created by the Autonomous Region of Sardinia as an independent agency. His organs are the Scientific Committee, the Executive Director and the Board of Auditors. Currently the Executive Director is Dr. Alessio Satta. The headquarters of the Regional Agency for Coastal Conservation of Sardinia is in the City of Cagliari

Mission

Sardinian coasts are composed by cliffs, islands and sand dunes, which are the result of geology, weather conditions and exposure to the ever-pounding sea. The agency manages some of the most beautiful locations belonging to the Sardinian historical and cultural heritage: lighthouses, harbours, towers and past archaeological sites. 

The Conservatoria acquires the most fragile and delicate territories by donations, by pre-emption in or, from time to time, by direct purchase. After ensuring all the restoration work, the Conservatoria can manage the areas by itself or entrusts the management to local authorities or other local groups or organisations. The Conservatoria determinates how the sites should be managed and what activities (such as agricultural or turistic activities) are compatible with its goals. The main objective of the Agency Conservatoria delle Coste is to ensure a sustainable development of coastal areas through an integrated management system and in particular the implementation of the Integrated Coastal Zone Management in Sardinia coastal areas under the institutional framework of the International Protocol and the European Union recommendation on coastal management.

The agency works in collaboration with the Priority Actions Programme and Regional Activity Centre of the Mediterranean Action Plan of UNEP to better manage Sardinian coastal zones, improving an integrated approach of the decision processes, able to take into account geographical, political, environmental, social, cultural, historical and economical aspects. This process, as well as the emerging coastal environmental challenges are being dealt, together with other Mediterranean countries .

The Conservatoria delle Coste carries out four specific priorities:

Priority 1: Conservation and local development
 conservation and valorisation of Sardinian historical coastal heritage
 scientific applied research on coastal and marine ecosystems
 implementation of sustainable local development strategies in partnership with coastal municipalities
 support and promotion of sustainable tourism, fishing and agriculture activities

Priority 2: Integrated Coastal Zone Management
 coordination and planning actions
 strategies for adaptation to climate change
 actions for strengthening coastal areas natural resilience
 coastal erosion risk mitigation strategies and monitoring

Priority 3: Awareness Raising and Environmental Education
 communication and public awareness
 environmental education for primary and high schools
 activities for the children, like street theatre and environmental games
 photo and video contests organized through cooperation with local authorities

Priority 4: International Cooperation
 international cooperation activities within the framework of the coastal integrated management, climate change and sustainable tourism

Images

Images of the Sardinian coast.

See also
 National Trust
 National Trust for Scotland
 Conservatoire du littoral
 Ökoinstitut Südtirol/Alto Adige

Line notes

External links
 The Conservatoria delle Coste Website (in Italian)
 Statute of the Agency (in Italian) (PDF document)

Sardinia
Land management
Land use
Nature conservation in Italy
Government agencies established in 2007
Environmental organisations based in Italy